American R&B singer-songwriter Chris Brown has released 10 studio albums, 9 mixtapes, 58 singles (including 118 as a featured artist) and 13 promotional singles.

According to Billboard, Brown has the ninth most Hot 100 entries on the chart with 114. As of December 2022, he has achieved 52 top 40 entries on the Hot 100 and 17 top 10 entries. Brown is the singer with the fifth-most consecutive weeks on the Hot 100 chart (161 weeks). According to the Recording Industry Association of America (RIAA), he is the eleventh-best selling digital singles artist in the United States with sales of 92 million.

Brown's self-titled debut album, Chris Brown was released on November 29, 2005; which reached at number 2 on the US Billboard 200, while charting into the top 10 on the several other music markets. It was later certified double platinum in the United States, and gold in Australia, Canada and the United Kingdom. The album's lead single, "Run It!" featuring Juelz Santana, peaked at number one on the US Billboard Hot 100, spending a month atop the chart. Internationally, the single charted at the top or in the top ten of several charts. Chris Brown also included the US top ten singles: "Yo (Excuse Me Miss)" and "Say Goodbye"; as well as the US R&B top 5 singles: "Gimme That" featuring Lil Wayne, and "Poppin'".

Brown released his second album, Exclusive on November 6, 2007. It followed in the steps of its predecessor, reaching the top ten into the several countries. Exclusive was certified double platinum in the United States and Australia, and platinum in the United Kingdom. The album also generated the singles "Kiss Kiss" featuring T-Pain, "With You" and "Forever". In addition, it contained the top five US R&B singles: "Take You Down", and "Superhuman" featuring Keri Hilson;, which this song has reached the top 30 into several countries. The album also included the single "Wall to Wall". On December 4, 2009, Brown released his third album Graffiti; which peaked into the top 10 on the US Billboard 200. It preceded the album with the release of the lead single, "I Can Transform Ya" featuring Lil Wayne and Swizz Beatz; which the song peaked within the top 20 on several countries. "Crawl" was also released as the second single from the album.

Brown released his fourth studio album F.A.M.E. on March 18, 2011; which became his first album to reach the number one on the US Billboard 200. It was certified gold in the United States, Australia and Ireland. Its lead single, "Yeah 3x" has reached the top 10 into several countries. The album's second single, "Look at Me Now" featuring Lil Wayne and Busta Rhymes; which became Brown's first top 10 single on the Billboard Hot 100 since 2008. F.A.M.E. has also spawned four other singles: "Beautiful People" featuring Benny Benassi, "She Ain't You", "Next to You" featuring Justin Bieber, and "Wet the Bed" featuring Ludacris. With only a mixtape cut of the single, "Deuces" featuring Tyga and Kevin McCall; has charted the top 20 on the Billboard Hot 100, and became Brown's first number one on the Hot R&B/Hip-Hop Songs chart since 2006. Brown released his fifth studio album, Fortune on June 29, 2012; which became his second number one album on the US Billboard 200. The album also spawned the US top 10 singles: "Turn Up the Music" and "Don't Wake Me Up".

Brown's sixth studio album, X was released on September 16, 2014, and was preceded by five singles: The lead single, "Fine China", reached the top ten in Australia, and was later certified gold by the Australian Recording Industry Association (ARIA). "Don't Think They Know" was released as the second single from the album, featuring the previously-unreleased vocals from a late Aaliyah. The third single, "Love More" featuring Nicki Minaj; which reached the top 10 in Australia, being certified gold by the ARIA. "Loyal" featuring Lil Wayne was the highest-charting single from the album, giving Brown his first top 10 single on the Billboard Hot 100 since "Don't Wake Me Up". "Loyal" has been certified four times platinum by the RIAA. The fifth and final single from X, was titled "New Flame" featuring Usher and Rick Ross.

After releasing the mixtape Fan of a Fan together in 2010, Brown and rapper Tyga released a collaborative album in 2015, each artist's first, titled Fan of a Fan: The Album. The album reached number 7 on the Billboard 200, becoming his joint-lowest charting album since Graffiti. Fan of a Fan: The Album has spawned the single "Ayo"; which was a commercial success in the United Kingdom, peaking at number 6 on the UK Singles Chart, and later being certified Silver by the BPI. On October 7, 2021 Fan of a Fan: The Album was Certified Gold By the RIAA.

Brown's seventh studio album, Royalty was released on December 18, 2015, and was preceded by four singles: "Liquor", which subsequently peaked at number 60 on the Billboard Hot 100. It was followed by two more singles: "Zero" and "Back to Sleep". The former peaked at number 80 on the Billboard Hot 100, and the latter debuted at number 20. "Fine by Me", was released as the album's fourth and final single on November 27, 2015. In 2016, Royalty was certified gold by the RIAA.

In 2017, Brown released his eighth studio album, Heartbreak on a Full Moon. One week after its release Heartbreak on a Full Moon was certified gold by the Recording Industry Association of America for combined sales and album-equivalent units of over 500,000 units in the United States, and Brown became the first R&B male artist that went gold in a week since Usher's Confessions in 2004. The album has been certified Double Platinum by the Recording Industry Association of America (RIAA).

His ninth studio album Indigo was released in 2019 and debuted at number one on the US Billboard 200 with 108,000 album-equivalent units, which included 28,000 pure album sales in its first week. The album is his third number-one album in the country, and included five singles: "Undecided", "Back to Love", "Wobble Up", featuring Nicki Minaj and G-Eazy, "No Guidance", featuring Drake, "Heat", featuring Gunna. On December 9, 2019 Indigo was certified Platinum by the RIAA.
 His single "Go Crazy" released the following year, alongside Young Thug as part of their collaborative mixtape Slime & B, reached number 3 on the Hot 100.

Albums

Studio albums

Collaborative albums

Mixtapes

Extended plays

Singles

As lead artist

As featured artist

Promotional singles

Other charted songs

Guest appearances

Production discography

Notes

A  "Superhuman" did not enter the Hot R&B/Hip-Hop Songs chart, but peaked at number 20 on the Bubbling Under R&B/Hip-Hop Singles chart.
B  "Yeah 3x" did not enter the Hot R&B/Hip-Hop Songs chart, but peaked at number 22 on the Bubbling Under R&B/Hip-Hop Singles chart.
C  "Beautiful People" did not enter the Hot R&B/Hip-Hop Songs chart, but peaked at number 1 on the Bubbling Under R&B/Hip-Hop Singles chart.
E  "Make the World Go Round" did not enter the Hot R&B/Hip-Hop Songs chart, but peaked at number 22 on the Bubbling Under R&B/Hip-Hop Singles chart.
F  "Head of My Class" did not enter the Hot R&B/Hip-Hop Songs chart, but peaked at number 23 on the Bubbling Under R&B/Hip-Hop Singles chart.
G  "Back to the Crib" did not enter the Billboard Hot 100, but peaked at number 24 on the Bubbling Under Hot 100 Singles chart.
H  "Ain't Thinkin' 'Bout You" did not enter the Billboard Hot 100, but peaked at number 11 on the Bubbling Under Hot 100 Singles chart.
I  "Pot of Gold" did not enter the Billboard Hot 100, but peaked at number 1 on the Bubbling Under Hot 100 Singles chart.
J  "International Love" did not enter the Hot R&B/Hip-Hop Songs chart, but peaked at number 11 on the Bubbling Under R&B/Hip-Hop Singles chart.
K  "Algo Me Gusta de Ti" did not enter the Billboard Hot 100, but peaked at number 10 on the Bubbling Under Hot 100 Singles chart.
L  "Long Gone" did not enter the Billboard Hot 100, but peaked at number 21 on the Bubbling Under Hot 100 Singles chart. It did not enter the Hot R&B/Hip-Hop Songs chart, but peaked at number 2 on the Bubbling Under R&B/Hip-Hop Singles chart.

M  "Ya Man Ain't Me" did not enter the Hot R&B/Hip-Hop Songs chart, but peaked at number 1 on the Bubbling Under R&B/Hip-Hop Singles chart.
N  "Damage" did not enter the Hot R&B/Hip-Hop Songs chart, but peaked at number 21 on the Bubbling Under R&B/Hip-Hop Singles chart.
O  "Better on the Other Side" did not enter the Hot R&B/Hip-Hop Songs chart, but peaked at number 13 on the Bubbling Under R&B/Hip-Hop Singles chart.
P  "Another Planet" did not enter the Hot R&B/Hip-Hop Songs chart, but peaked at number 2 on the Bubbling Under R&B/Hip-Hop Singles chart.
Q  "Oh Yeah" did not enter the Hot R&B/Hip-Hop Songs chart, but peaked at number 19 on the Bubbling Under R&B/Hip-Hop Singles chart.
R  "Paper, Scissors, Rock" did not enter the Hot R&B/Hip-Hop Songs chart, but peaked at number 23 on the Bubbling Under R&B/Hip-Hop Singles chart.
S  "Undercover" did not enter the Hot R&B/Hip-Hop Songs chart, but peaked at number 15 on the Bubbling Under R&B/Hip-Hop Singles chart.
T  "Look at Her Go" did not enter the Billboard Hot 100, but peaked at number 22 on the Bubbling Under Hot 100 Singles chart.
U  "Arena" did not enter the Billboard Hot 100, but peaked at number 16 on the Bubbling Under Hot 100 Singles chart.
V  "Marry Go Round" did not enter the Hot R&B/Hip-Hop Songs chart, but peaked at number 1 on the Bubbling Under R&B/Hip-Hop Singles chart.
W  "Anyway" did not enter the Billboard Hot 100, but peaked at number 7 on the Bubbling Under Hot 100 Singles.
X  "Wrist" did not enter the Billboard Hot 100, but peaked at number 17 on the Bubbling Under Hot 100 Singles.
Z  "Songs on 12 Play" did not enter the Billboard Hot 100, but peaked at number 25 on the Bubbling Under Hot 100 Singles.
Z  "Drunk Texting" did not enter the Billboard Hot 100, but peaked at number 24 on the Bubbling Under Hot 100 Singles.
Z  "Autumn Leaves" did not enter the Billboard Hot 100, but peaked at number 10 on the Bubbling Under Hot 100 Singles.

See also
Chris Brown videography

References

External links
[ Discography of Chris Brown] at Allmusic

Discographies of American artists
Pop music discographies
Rhythm and blues discographies
Production discographies
Discography